Quidam is the debut album of Polish Progressive rock group with the same name, released May 1996. The album was released at the First Warsaw Prog-Fest 1996. It contains nine songs of melodic symphonic rock.

Track listing 
 "Sanktuarium" (Derkowska, Florek, Meller, Szajerski) – 8:57
 "Choćbym..." (Florek, Meller, Scholl, Szadkowski) – 7:05
 "Bajkowy" (Florek, Meller, Niewiadomska) – 3:42
 "Głęboka Rzeka" (Chosinski, Derkowska, Florek, Meller) – 8:03
 "Nocne Widziadła" (Florek, Meller) – 7:21
 "Niespetnienie" (Florek, Meller, Szadkowski, Wojciechowski) – 9:44
 "Warkocze" (Dziewialtowska-Gintowt, Florek, Meller) – 4:07
 "Bijące Serca" (Florek, Meller) – 1:53
 "Płonę" (Florek, Jermakow, Meller, Szadkowski) – 14:09

Personnel 

 Emila "Iza" Derkowska – vocals, cello, flute
 Ewa Smarzynska – flute
 Zbyszek "Zibi" Florek – keyboards
 Rafal "Makow" Jermakow – drums, percussion
 Maciek "Maciecz" Meller – guitars
 Radek "Tysy" Scholl – bass

References

1996 debut albums
Quidam (band) albums